Ananda Raehan Alief (born 17 December 2003) is an Indonesian professional footballer who plays as a defensive midfielder for Liga 1 club PSM Makassar.

Club career

PSM Makassar
Raehan is an original player from the PSM Makassar Academy. Last season he participated with PSM U-18 in the Elite Pro Academy, in the 2022 AFC Cup, Raehan played three matches as a substitute. Raehan made his league debut on 23 July 2022 in a match against PSS Sleman at the Maguwoharjo Stadium, Sleman. Raehan played the full 90 minutes in a 5–1 win against Persib Bandung on 28 August 2022.

On 14 January 2023, Raehan scored his first league goal for PSM Makassar with in a 4–0 win over PSS Sleman at Parepare.

Career statistics

Club

Notes

References

External links
 Ananda Raehan at Soccerway
 Ananda Raehan at Liga Indonesia

2003 births
Living people
Indonesian footballers
People from Makassar
Sportspeople from South Sulawesi
Sportspeople from Makassar
Liga 1 (Indonesia) players
PSM Makassar players
Association football midfielders